Joline Höstman (born 24 September 1988) is a Swedish swimmer from Gothenburg. She was born Höglund but changed her name in 2007 to her mother's maiden name.

Personal bests

Long course (50 m)

Short course (25 m)

Clubs
Göteborg Sim

References

1988 births
Living people
Swimmers at the 2008 Summer Olympics
Swimmers at the 2012 Summer Olympics
Olympic swimmers of Sweden
European Aquatics Championships medalists in swimming
Göteborg Sim swimmers
Swedish female breaststroke swimmers
Swimmers from Gothenburg
20th-century Swedish women
21st-century Swedish women